Eloy Teruel Rovira (born 20 November 1982) is a Spanish cyclist. At the 2012 Summer Olympics, he competed for Spain in the men's omnium. As a rider for the Jamis team at the prestigious Tour of California, Eloy gained widespread coverage for celebrating what he believed to be a victory in the 7th stage, a lap before the end of the race; he ended up 56th.

Major results
2005
2nd Gran Premio Ciudad de Vigo
2007
 7th Prueba Villafranca de Ordizia
2013
 2nd  Points race, UCI Track World Championships
 3rd  Points race, UEC European Track Championships
2014
 2nd  Scratch race, UEC European Track Championships
 3rd  Points race, UCI Track World Championships
2015
 2nd  Points race, UCI Track World Championships
2019
 5th Time trial, National Road Championships

References

External links

Spanish male cyclists
Living people
Olympic cyclists of Spain
Cyclists at the 2012 Summer Olympics
Spanish track cyclists
1982 births
Sportspeople from Murcia
Cyclists from the Region of Murcia
Cyclists at the 2020 Summer Paralympics